Irina Davydovna Kuznetsova (born 1923) was a Soviet-Latvian communist politician.

Kuznetsova served as Minister of Food Industry from 1965 to 1984.

References

1923 births
Possibly living people
20th-century Latvian women politicians
Latvian communists
Soviet women in politics
Women government ministers of Latvia